The 2012 Judo Grand Prix Baku was held in Baku, Azerbaijan from 5 to 6 May 2012.

Medal summary

Men's events

Women's events

Source Results

Medal table

References

External links
 

2012 IJF World Tour
2012 Judo Grand Prix
Judo
Grand Prix Baku 2012
Judo
Judo